This is a list of episodes for the animated TV series The Dreamstone.

The Dreamstone aired between 1990 and 1995 with a total of 4 Seasons and 52 episodes. Each episode has basically the same plot – Zordrak instructs his henchmen to steal the Dreamstone, which he plans to destroy, so that nightmares will plague the sleeping world. The plan usually involves Urpgor, his right-hand man and scientist inventing some means with which the Urpneys – led by Sergeant Blob, an archetypal Sergeant Major type – crosses the Mist of Limbo (a vast Purple Mist) to get to the Land of Dreams. The plan invariably fails, the main problem being the cowardice and incompetence of the Urpneys, who often want no more than to 'go home' and get some sandwiches.

Series 1 (1990)

Series 2 (1992)

Series 3 (1994)

Series 4 (1995)

Lists of British animated television series episodes